Ultraviolet refers to electromagnetic radiation with a wavelength shorter than that of visible light, but longer than soft X-rays.

Ultraviolet, UltraViolet, or Ultra Violet may also refer to:

Film and television
 Ultraviolet (TV serial), a 1998 British television miniseries
 Ultraviolet (film), a 2006 science fiction film
 Ultraviolet (novel), a 2006 novel adapted from the film
 Ultraviolet: Code 044, a 2008 Japanese anime based on the film
 Ultraviolet (2017 TV series), a Polish television series
 Ultraviolet (Arrowverse), Esperanza Garcia, a character from the TV series The Flash
 Ultra Violet, Violet Rodriguez, the titular heroine from the 2022 TV series Ultra Violet & Black Scorpion

Music

Album
 Ultraviolet (All About Eve album), 1992
 Ultraviolet (EP), a 2014 EP by Owl City
 Ultraviolet (Kelly Moran album), 2018
 Ultraviolet (Kid Sister album), 2009
 Ultraviolet (Kylesa album), 2013
 Ultraviolet (Misery Signals album), 2020
 Ultraviolet (Poets of the Fall album), 2018
 Ultraviolet (Pseudo Echo album), 2014, or the title track
 Ultraviolet (Sadistik album), 2014
 Ultra Violet (Bananarama album), 1995
 Ultraviolet, a 1994 album by Ed Alleyne-Johnson, or the title track
 Houseworks Presents Ultraviolet, a 2002 album by DJ Antoine; see DJ Antoine discography

Song
 "Ultraviolet"/"The Ballad of Paul K", a 2005 single by McFly
 "Ultraviolet (Light My Way)", a 1991 song by U2
 "Ultraviolet" (Fred V & Grafix song), 2016 
 "Ultraviolet", a 1978 song by Romano Musumarra and Claudio Gizzi from Automat
 "Ultraviolet", a 2001 song by Annetenna from Annetenna
 "Ultraviolet", a 2003 song by Karl Bartos from Communication
 "Ultraviolet", a 2006 song by Joanna Pacitti from This Crazy Life
 "Ultraviolet", a 2008 song by The B-52's from Funplex
 "Ultraviolet", a 2008 song by Stiff Dylans from the soundtrack to the film Angus, Thongs and Perfect Snogging
 "Ultraviolet", a 2010 song by Miami Horror from Illumination
 "Ultraviolet", a 2013 song by FKA twigs from EP2
 "Ultraviolet", a 2013 song by Erra from Augment

Other uses
 Ultra Violet (Isabelle Collin Dufresne), French-American artist and author
 UltraViolet (organization), a women's advocacy group in the United States
 UltraViolet (website), a digital rights authentication and cloud-based licensing system

See also
 UV (disambiguation)
 Violet (disambiguation)